This is a list of episodes of the 2014 Japanese tokusatsu television series Garo: Makai no Hana, the sequel to 2005 & 2006's Garo.

Episodes


{| class="wikitable" width="98%"
|- style="border-bottom:8px solid gold;"
! style="width:4%;"| # !! Title !! Writer !! Original airdate
|-| colspan="4" style="background:#e6e9ff;"|

 Fossil 

|-| colspan="4" style="background:#e6e9ff;"|

 Vermin 

|-| colspan="4" style="background:#e6e9ff;"|

 Greenhouse 

|-| colspan="4" style="background:#e6e9ff;"|

 Film 

|-| colspan="4" style="background:#e6e9ff;"|

 Star Chart 

|-| colspan="4" style="background:#e6e9ff;"|

 Wind Chime 

|-| colspan="4" style="background:#e6e9ff;"|

 Mythology 

|-| colspan="4" style="background:#e6e9ff;"|

 Family 

|-| colspan="4" style="background:#e6e9ff;"|

 Raising 

|-| colspan="4" style="background:#e6e9ff;"|

 Dinner Table 

|-| colspan="4" style="background:#e6e9ff;"|

 Comics 

|-| colspan="4" style="background:#e6e9ff;"|

 The Power of Words 

|-| colspan="4" style="background:#e6e9ff;"|

 Rabid 

|-| colspan="4" style="background:#e6e9ff;"|

 Transformation 

|-| colspan="4" style="background:#e6e9ff;"|

 Black Tea 

|-| colspan="4" style="background:#e6e9ff;"|

 Scream 

|-| colspan="4" style="background:#e6e9ff;"|

 Boy 

|-| colspan="4" style="background:#e6e9ff;"|

 Crimson Lotus 

|-| colspan="4" style="background:#e6e9ff;"|

 Suite 

|-| colspan="4" style="background:#e6e9ff;"|

 Iron Man 

|-| colspan="4" style="background:#e6e9ff;"|

 Afterimage 

|-| colspan="4" style="background:#e6e9ff;"|

 Watchdog 

|-| colspan="4" style="background:#e6e9ff;"|

 Retrospective 

|-| colspan="4" style="background:#e6e9ff;"|

 Visitor 

|-| colspan="4" style="background:#e6e9ff;"|

 God's Will 

|}

References

Makai no Hana episodes
Garo Makai no Hana